Matt Bell (born 1980) is an American writer. He is the author of Appleseed (2021), How They Were Found (2010) and Cataclysm Baby (2012). He received his BA from Oakland University and his MFA from Bowling Green State University. In 2012, he took a position as an assistant professor in the English department at Northern Michigan University, and currently teaches in the English department at Arizona State University.

Bell is the senior editor at Dzanc Books, as well as the founding editor of The Collagist, a monthly online literary magazine. His short fiction has also appeared in numerous literary magazines, including Conjunctions, Hayden's Ferry Review, Gulf Coast, Guernica, Willow Springs, Unsaid, and American Short Fiction. His stories have been anthologized in The Best American Mystery Stories, Best American Fantasy, and 30 Under 30: an Anthology of Innovative Fiction by Younger Writers.

Reception 
How They Were Found was reviewed favorably in The Believer, American Book Review, and The Rumpus. At HTMLGiant, Kyle Minor wrote that "Matt Bell has built a national reputation on his own terms, completely outside the support system of New York publishing, on the strength of his stories and novellas, which are wholly original and singularly his own. He is that rare sort of writer whose work the reader would recognize even if were published anonymously. It is formally daring, high-stakes, languaged-up stuff, and (lucky us!), the best of it has finally been collected at book length."

Cleveland Review of Books reviewed Appleseed: A Novel, calling Bell's prose "visceral and sensuous" as it explored humanity's "narrow, immediate, and self-serving worldview."

Bibliography
How They Were Found (short fiction) (Keyhole Press, 2010)
Cataclysm Baby (Mud Luscious Press, 2012)
In the House upon the Dirt between the Lake and the Woods  (Soho Press, 2013)
Baldur's Gate II (Boss Fight Books, 2015)
Scrapper (Soho Press, 2015)
A Tree or a Person or a Wall (Soho Press, 2016)
Appleseed: A Novel (2021)

References

External links 
 Official Website
 "Dredge," a short story published in Hayden's Ferry Review
 "His Last Great Gift," a short story published in Conjunctions
 Interview with author at Tin House

Living people
American male writers
1980 births
Bowling Green State University alumni
Northern Michigan University faculty